Mohammad Khan Qajar was the khan (governor) of the Erivan Khanate from 1784 to 1805.

Biography 

Mohammad Khan of Erivan belonged to the Qovanlu branch of the Qajar tribe. In order to preserve his realm, he acknowledged the suzerainty of Heraclius II, the ruler of the eastern Georgian kingdom of (Kartli-Kakheti). He was later taken into custody under the orders of Agha Mohammad Khan, the Qajar king (shah) of Iran. However, because of their shared Qajar ancestry, Mohammad Khan was spared. Agha Mohammad Khan's successor, Fath-Ali Shah Qajar, sent him back to Erivan to continue as its governor. Although Mohammad Khan was not noted for being courageous, he was skilled in politics and maintained contact with the Russians and Ottomans, while also guaranteeing Iran his allegiance.

On March 23/24, 1801, the Russian emperor Paul I died and was succeeded by his son Alexander I. He installed Knorring as the governor of Georgia, and instructed him to persuade various khanates that Fath-Ali Shah's authority had not yet been established in—such as Erivan, Ganja, Shakki, Shirvan, and Baku—to request Russian protection. This demonstrates that Alexander, unlike his father, sought to conquer the entire area that was situated between the Aras and Kur rivers. Russian soldiers were now permanently stationed in Tiflis (now Tbilisi) and were prepared to advance to the banks of the Aras River.

Because Javad Khan of Ganja continued to remain faithful to the shah, the Russian general Ivan Petrovich Lazarev attempted to sway Mohammad Khan of Erivan and Kalb-Ali Khan Kangarlu of Nakhichevan to the Russian side. Albeit both khans at first reacted positively to this, they ultimately declined.

In January 1802, rumours circulated that Fath-Ali Shah had sent one of his commander to Tabriz to prepare for an invasion of Nakhichevan and the removal of Kalb-Ali Khan from his post. If Mohammad Khan of Erivan did not yield to the shah, the commander his men were to advance to Erivan and then wait for the shah and the rest of the Iranian forces to appear. Several other rumours also later circulated, such as the planned Iranian siege of Erivan and attack on Tiflis. None of these rumours turned out be true, as other events had caught the attention of the shah; the Wahhabi sack of Karbala, the third campaign in Khorasan, and the murder of the Iranian envoy Hajji Khalil Khan in Bombay (now Mumbai). Fath-Ali Shah was busy with these matters from March 1802 to March 1803.

On April 21, 1802, Knorring was back in Tiflis. Under the emperors orders, Knorring was to convince the khans of Erivan and Ganja to accept Russian garrisons, in order to protect Georgia from a possible Iranian invasion. During this period Mohammad Khan of Erivan had remained in his fortress, whilst sending contradictory messages to the shah and Lazarev, declaring his allegiance to both. Lazarev replied back, stating that he needed Knorring's permission to negotiate. Mohammad Khan of Erivan's emissary stayed in Tiflis until receiving Knorring's reply. The latter soon replied, urging Mohammad Khan of Erivan to send a formal request with an official signature and seal to the emperor, so that Erivan could be put under Russian protection.

In 1805, Mohammad Khan of Erivan was dismissed to Iran by the shah due to his interactions with Russia during and after the siege of Erivan. He was succeeded by Mehdi Qoli Khan Qajar.

Mohammad Khan's son, Hossein Khan Sardar, served as the last khan of Erivan from 1807 to 1827. His daughter, selected by Fath-Ali Shah himself, married prince Mahmud Mirza, Fath-Ali Shah's fifteenth son, and became his chief wife.

References

Sources 
 
 
 
 

People of Qajar Iran

18th-century births
19th-century deaths
Year of birth unknown
Year of death unknown
Qajar governors

People of the Russo-Persian Wars
Khans of Erivan
Qajar tribe
18th-century Iranian people
19th-century Iranian people